Kristianstad Arena is a hall for handball matches and public events in Kristianstad, Sweden. It has a capacity for 4,700 spectators for sport events and 5,000 for concerts. It's the home venue for the Swedish handball team IFK Kristianstad and it hosted matches during the 2011 World Men's Handball Championship.

See also
List of indoor arenas in Sweden

References

External links 

 

Indoor arenas in Sweden
Handball venues in Sweden
Buildings and structures in Skåne County
Sport in Kristianstad Municipality
Sports venues completed in 2010
2010 establishments in Sweden
21st-century establishments in Skåne County